Alexander Breidvik (born 17 March 1986) is a retired Norwegian football midfielder.

Hailing from Askvoll, he first became known in 2002, when he won a talent contest held by the television channel TV3. He then joined Sogndal Fotball, and got one Norwegian Premier League game in 2003 and two in 2004. Sogndal were then relegated.

In early 2007, Breidvik suffered a serious head trauma at La Manga, effectively ending his professional career. In 2008 his former teammates arranged a fundraiser for him.

References

External links 
 

1986 births
Living people
Norwegian footballers
Sogndal Fotball players
People from Askvoll
Eliteserien players
Norwegian First Division players
Association football midfielders
Norway youth international footballers
Sportspeople from Vestland